Stanford station is a Caltrain station in Palo Alto, California, near the stadium on the Stanford University campus. It is not a regular stop; instead, it is only in service for Stanford football home games and other large events at the stadium. The usual stop for the university is the Palo Alto station. The station does not have ticket vending machines; however, when in use, Caltrain staff will be present with handheld Clipper card readers so people can tag on and off.

Service to the station has existed since at least 1922 (one year after Stanford Stadium opened). In 1994, an estimated 20% of the visitors to the 1994 FIFA World Cup games at Stanford arrived by train.

References

External links

Caltrain stations in Santa Clara County, California
Stanford University
Railway stations in the United States opened in 1922
Former Southern Pacific Railroad stations in California